Local elections were held in Serbia (excluding  Kosovo) on 19 September and 3 October 2004, concurrently with the 2004 Vojvodina provincial election. This was the only local election cycle held while Serbia was a member of the State Union of Serbia and Montenegro.

This was the first regular cycle of local elections held in Serbia since the fall of Slobodan Milošević in October 2000, and the voting procedure was significantly changed from the previous cycle. Under the prior system, local assembly members were elected by first-past-the-post balloting in single-member constituencies. The 2004 elections were held under a system of proportional representation with a three per cent electoral threshold. Successful lists were required to receive three per cent of all votes, not only of valid votes.

This cycle also saw the introduction of direct election for the mayors in most of Serbia's cities and municipalities, though not in the constituent municipalities of the City of Belgrade. The mayors were elected over two rounds, with the second round of voting taking place on 3 October 2004. The direct election of mayors was later abandoned, and in future election cycles the mayors were chosen by the elected members of the local assemblies.

One-third of assembly mandates were assigned to candidates from successful electoral lists in numerical order. The other two-thirds were assigned to other candidates on the same lists at the discretion of the sponsoring parties or coalitions; at least one quarter of the latter mandates were to be assigned to "members of the less represented sex on the list" (which, in practical terms, usually meant that these mandates were reserved for female candidates).

For the newly restructured constituent municipalities of Niš, elections were held for mayors and for members of nine-person municipal councils (rather than municipal assemblies).

The campaign saw growth in support for both the centre-left Democratic Party and the far-right Serbian Radical Party, both of which were at the time in opposition in the republican parliament.

The most closely watched election was that for mayor of Belgrade. In the second round of voting, Democratic Party candidate Nenad Bogdanović narrowly defeated Aleksandar Vučić, who was at the time a member of the Radical Party.

Results

Belgrade

City of Belgrade
The Democratic Party won both the mayoral election and a plurality victory in the city assembly.

Bogdanović died on 27 September 2007. He was replaced on an interim basis by Zoran Alimpić, also of the Democratic Party.

Results of the election for the City Assembly of Belgrade:

The Democratic Alternative list did not receive three per cent of the total vote and so fell below the electoral threshold.

Municipalities of Belgrade
Municipal assembly elections were held in sixteen of Belgrade's seventeen constituent municipalities. The exception was Barajevo, where a special off-year election had taken place in 2003.

The elections were generally a success for the Democratic Party, which finished first in most municipalities and ultimately attained the mayoralty in eleven. The Radicals won the mayor's offices in Zemun and Surčin, the Democratic Party of Serbia won the mayoralty in Lazarevac, and independents were chosen as mayor in Grocka and Sopot.

Barajevo
There was no election for the Municipal Assembly of Barajevo in 2004. The previous election had taken place in 2002, and the next took place in 2006.

Čukarica
Results of the election for the Municipal Assembly of Čukarica:

Dragan Tešić of the Democratic Party was chosen as mayor after the election.

Grocka
Results of the election for the Municipal Assembly of Grocka:

Although the Radicals technically won a plurality victory, the election did not even come close to producing a clear winner, and the next four years saw several changes in the local government.

Blažo Stojanović, elected at the head of an independent list, was chosen as mayor after the election, in an alliance with the Democratic Party, the Democratic Party of Serbia, the Serbian Renewal Movement, the Strength of Serbia Movement, and the Social Democratic Party. The coalition fell apart in mid-2005, and local Radical Party leader Dragoljub Simonović became mayor at the head of a new governing alliance. In late 2005, Stojanović was able to return as mayor with a coalition including the Socialists, the Democratic Party of Serbia, the Serbian Renewal Movement, the Social Democratic Party, and Vladan Zarić's list. The Socialists and the Democratic Party withdrew their support in mid-2007, and Stojanović created a new coalition including the Radicals and Strength of Serbia Movement. One member of Strength of Serbia defected to the opposition in December 2007, leading to a period of confusion in which both the government and opposition claimed to control a majority of seats. This lasted until new local elections took place in May 2008.

Lazarevac
Results of the election for the Municipal Assembly of Lazarevac:

The election did not produce a clear winner. Branko Borić of the Democratic Party of Serbia was subsequently chosen as mayor.

Mladenovac
Results of the election for the Municipal Assembly of Mladenovac:

Incumbent mayor Zoran Kostić of the Democratic Party was confirmed for another term in office after the election.

New Belgrade
Results of the election for the Municipal Assembly of New Belgrade:

Incumbent mayor Željko Ožegović of the Democratic Party was confirmed for another term in office after the election, with the support of thirty-eight delegates. Nenad Milenković was one of the DS candidates elected to the assembly. Parliamentarian Marko Đurišić received the largely honorary sixty-seventh and final position on the DS list and was not given a mandate.

Obrenovac
Results of the election for the Municipal Assembly of Obrenovac:

Although the Radical Party technically won the election, it could not command a majority of seats in the assembly. Nebojša Ćeran of the Democratic Party was selected as mayor.

Palilula
Results of the election for the Municipal Assembly of Palilula:

Danilo Bašić of the Democratic Party was chosen as mayor after the election.

Rakovica
Results of the election for the Municipal Assembly of Rakovica:

Bojan Milić of the Democratic Party was chosen as mayor after the election.

Savski Venac
Results of the election for the Municipal Assembly of Savski Venac:

Tomislav Đorđević of the Democratic Party was selected as mayor after the election. A member of the Democratic Party of Serbia was chosen as deputy mayor.

Sopot
Results of the election for the Municipal Assembly of Sopot:

Incumbent mayor Živorad Milosavljević of the For the Municipality of Sopot list was confirmed for another term in office after the election.

Stari Grad
Results of the election for the Municipal Assembly of Stari Grad:

Incumbent mayor Mirjana Božidarević of the Democratic Party was confirmed for another term in office after the election. Nemanja Šarović was elected from the first position on the Radical Party's list.

Surčin
Results of the election for the Municipal Assembly of Surčin:

Rajko Matović of the Radical Party was chosen as mayor after the election. After a period of political upheaval, Vojislav Janošević of the Democratic Party became mayor in November 2005.

Voždovac
Results of the election for the Municipal Assembly of Voždovac:

Vračar
Results of the election for the Municipal Assembly of Vračar:

Incumbent mayor Milena Milošević of the Democratic Party was confirmed for another term in office after the election. Her deputy mayor was a member of the Democratic Party of Serbia. Milošević was replaced by Branimir Kuzmanović on 13 June 2006.

Zemun
Results of the election for the Municipal Assembly of Zemun:

Gordana Pop Lazić of the Radical Party was selected as mayor after the election, with support from the Socialists and the Strength of Serbia Movement. Parliamentarian Vjerica Radeta was elected as a Radical Party delegate.

Zvezdara
Results of the election for the Municipal Assembly of Zvezdara:

Milan Popović of the Democratic Party was chosen as mayor after the election. Ljubiša Stojmirović of the Radical Party became mayor on 18 February 2005; Popović returned to office on 28 June of the same year.

Vojvodina

North Bačka District
Local elections were held in all three municipalities in the North Bačka District, and the Alliance of Vojvodina Hungarians won the mayoralties in all three jurisdictions. In Subotica, the party won a narrow victory over the Democratic Party; in the two other municipalities, candidates of the party won in local alliances with the Democrats.

Subotica

Results of the election for the Municipal Assembly of Subotica:

Bačka Topola

Results of the election for the Municipal Assembly of Bačka Topola:

Future parliamentarian Árpád Fremond appeared on the list of the Alliance of Vojvodina Hungarians, although he was not awarded a mandate on this occasion.

Mali Iđoš

Results of the election for the Municipal Assembly of Mali Iđoš:

South Bačka District
Elections were held in the one city (Novi Sad) and all eleven separate municipalities in the South Bačka District.

The City of Novi Sad comprises two municipalities (the City municipality of Novi Sad and Petrovaradin), although their powers are very limited relative to the city government. Unlike Belgrade, Niš, and Vranje, Novi Sad does not have directly elected municipal assemblies.

The Radical Party performed unexpectedly well in South Bačka, narrowly winning the mayoral contest in Novi Sad and also winning the mayoralties of five other municipalities. The Democratic Party and G17 won two mayoral contests apiece, a candidate of the People's Democratic Party won in Bečej, and independent candidate Branko Gajin won in Srbobran.

Novi Sad

Results of the election for the City Assembly of Novi Sad:

The Radicals attained a working majority in the assembly with the support of the Socialists and the Democratic Party of Serbia (whose delegates aligned themselves with the Radicals over the objections of the party's leadership).

Former mayor Milorad Mirčić, who had been defeated in 2000, was re-elected to the assembly after receiving the seventh position on the Radical Party's list. Future parliamentarian Nada Lazić, a member of the League of Social Democrats of Vojvodina, was elected from the third position on the Together for Vojvodina list.

Bač

Results of the election for the Municipal Assembly of Bač:

Bačka Palanka

Results of the election for the Municipal Assembly of Bačka Palanka:

The municipal assembly was not properly constituted after the election, and a new local election was held in December 2005. The Radical Party won fourteen seats in the re-vote, the Democratic Party eight seats, the Socialist Party of Serbia five seats, the Strength of Serbia Movement five seats, the Democratic Party of Serbia four seats, G17 Plus four seats, and the Serbian Renewal Movement two seats.

Bački Petrovac

Results of the election for the Municipal Assembly of Bački Petrovac:

Bečej

The People's Democratic Party merged into the Democratic Party of Serbia in late 2004; Predin did not participate in the merger but instead joined the Strength of Serbia Movement. He was defeated in a recall election in late 2005, and a new mayoral election was held the following year. The latter election was won by Dušan Jovanović of the Democratic Party of Serbia.

Results of the election for the Municipal Assembly of Bečej:

Beočin

Results of the election for the Municipal Assembly of Beočin:

Srbobran

Results of the election for the Municipal Assembly of Srbobran:

Sremski Karlovci

Results of the election for the Municipal Assembly of Sremski Karlovci:

Temerin

Results of the election for the Municipal Assembly of Temerin:

Future parliamentarian Rozália Ökrész appeared on the Alliance of Vojvodina Hungarians list but did not receive a mandate.

Titel

Results of the election for the Municipal Assembly of Titel:

Vrbas

Results of the election for the Municipal Assembly of Vrbas:

Žabalj

Results of the election for the Municipal Assembly of Žabalj:

West Bačka District
Elections were held in all four municipalities of the West Bačka District. The Democratic Party won the mayoralty in Sombor, the largest community, while the Socialists won in Apatin and the Radicals won in Kula and Odžaci. Subsequently, the Radical Party mayor in Kula was defeated in a recall election, and the Democratic Party won the by-election that followed.

Sombor

Results of the election for the Municipal Assembly of Sombor:

Future parliamentarian Žika Gojković of the Serbian Renewal Movement was elected on the SPO–NDS list. Former and future parliamentarian Zlata Đerić was elected on the New Serbia list.

Apatin

Results of the election for the Municipal Assembly of Apatin:

Kula

Đuričić was defeated in a recall election in 2006, and a mayoral by-election was held later in that year.

Results of the election for the Municipal Assembly of Kula:

Odžaci

Results of the election for the Municipal Assembly of Odžaci:

Central Serbia (excluding Belgrade)

Nišava District
Local elections were held in the City of Niš, the five constituent municipalities of Niš, and five of the six other municipalities in the Nišava District. The exception was Ražanj, where the last elections had taken place in 2002. In the constituent municipalities of Niš, elections were held for nine-member municipal councils rather than full municipal assemblies.

Smiljko Kostić of New Serbia's political coalition somewhat unexpectedly won the mayoral contest in Niš, defeating Democratic Party incumbent Goran Ćirić in the second round. It was only with difficulty that Kostić established a functional coalition government supported by the assembly, where New Serbia won only four out of sixty-one seats.

The Democratic Party won two of Niš's municipal mayoralties, and a candidate of the Serbian Renewal Movement aligned with the Democratic Party won a third. The Serbian Radical Party and the Democratic Party of Serbia split the remaining two. There was no clear pattern outside the city, where the Radicals won in Aleksinac, a local group aligned with the Strength of Serbia Movement won in Doljevac, the Socialist Party of Serbia won in Gadžin Han, an independent won in Merošina, and G17 Plus won in Svrljig. Generally, there was a trend toward membership of the local assemblies being divided among multiple parties, often with no group holding a clear advantage.

Niš

Results of the election for the City Assembly of Niš:

Crveni Krst

Results of the election for the Municipal Council of Crveni Krst:

Medijana

Results of the election for the Municipal Council of Medijana:

Niška Banja

Results of the election for the Municipal Council of Niška Banja:

Palilula, Niš

Đorđević left the Serbian Renewal Movement in November 2007 and joined G17 Plus in March 2008.

Results of the election for the Municipal Council of Palilula, Niš:

Pantelej

Bratislav Blagojević was expelled from the Democratic Party in June 2005 and later joined G17 Plus.

Results of the election for the Municipal Council of Pantelej:

Aleksinac

Results of the election for the Municipal Assembly of Aleksinac:

Doljevac

Ljubić later switched his affiliation at the republican level to New Serbia. He was also the leader of a local group called "Movement for the South," which worked in alignment with the aforementioned parties. There was an effort to initiate a recall vote against Ljubić in 2005, although it is not clear from online reports if the initiative made it to a vote.

Results of the election for the Municipal Assembly of Doljevac:

Subsequent elections were held in Doljevac on 1 October 2006 to elect members of the municipal assembly. The results do not appear to be available online. Goran Ljubić's status as mayor was not affected, and the next local assembly elections after this took place as part of the regular cycle in 2008.

Gadžin Han

Results of the election for the Municipal Assembly of Gadžin Han:

Merošina

Results of the election for the Municipal Assembly of Merošina:

Ražanj
There were no municipal elections in Ražanj in 2004. The previous elections had taken place in 2002-03, and the next elections took place in 2006.

Svrljig

Results of the election for the Municipal Assembly of Svrljig:

Podunavlje District
Local elections were held in the one city (Smederevo) and the two other municipalities of the Podunavlje District. The Democratic Party won the greatest number of seats in both Smederevo and Smederevska Palanka but did not win the mayoralty in either community; independent candidate Jasna Avramović won in the former community, while Radoslav Cokić won in the latter. The Democratic Party of Serbia won in Velika Plana.

Smederevo

Jasna Avramović was defeated in a recall election in 2005. A by-election to choose her successor took place in early 2006.

Results of the election for the Municipal Assembly of Smederevo:

Smederevska Palanka

Results of the election for the Municipal Assembly of Smederevska Palanka:

Velika Plana

Results of the election for the Municipal Assembly of Velika Plana:

Pomoravlje District
Elections were held in four of the six municipalities of the Pomoravlje District. The exceptions were Despotovac, which had elected a mayor and assembly members in 2002, and Ćuprija, which had done so in 2003. The newly formed United Serbia party won a significant victory in its home base of Jagodina, and independent populist Dobrivoje Budimirović (formerly of the Socialist Party of Serbia) won a first-round victory in Svilajnac. The Democratic Party won in Paraćin, and a former Democrat aligned with the Serbian Renewal Movement won the mayoral election in Rekovac.

Jagodina

Results of the election for the Municipal Assembly of Jagodina:

Ćuprija
There were no municipal elections in Ćuprija in 2004. The previous elections had taken place in 2003, and the next elections appear to have taken place in 2008.

Despotovac
There were no municipal elections in Despotovac in 2004. The previous elections had taken place in 2002, and the next elections took place in 2006.

Paraćin

Results of the election for the Municipal Assembly of Paraćin:

Rekovac

Results of the election for the Municipal Assembly of Rekovac:

Svilajnac

Gorica Gajić was chosen as the municipality's deputy mayor after the election. Budimirović won a recall election in 2007.

Results of the election for the Municipal Assembly of Svilajnac:

Raška District
Local elections were held in four of the five municipalities of the Raška District. The exception was Kraljevo, the capital, where the previous election had taken place in 2003.

The List for Sandžak coalition won the elections in the predominantly Bosniak municipalities of Novi Pazar and Tutin. It failed to win a majority in the Novi Pazar assembly, however, and the rival Sandžak Democratic Party was able to form a coalition administration with other parties in the assembly.

The Socialist Party of Serbia won in Raška, and an independent list led by a former Socialist won in Vrnjačka Banja.

Kraljevo
There were no municipal elections in Kraljevo in 2004. The previous mayoral and assembly elections had taken place in 2003, the next mayoral election took place in 2006, and the next assembly elections appear to have taken place in 2008.

Novi Pazar

Results of the election for the Municipal Assembly of Novi Pazar:

Although Sulejman Ugljanin won the mayoral election, the Sandžak Democratic Party was able to form a coalition government with the Serbian Radical Party, the Party for Sandžak, and the Serbian Democratic Alliance. The divided nature of the city's government led to an extremely tense political scene in the municipality. A 2006 recall election campaign against Ugljanin ended in chaos, and a new municipal assembly election was held in 2006.

Raška

Results of the election for the Municipal Assembly of Raška:

Tutin

Results of the election for the Municipal Assembly of Tutin:

Bajro Gegić of the Party of Democratic Action of Sandžak was chosen as deputy mayor after the election and served in the role for the next four years.

Vrnjačka Banja

Results of the election for the Municipal Assembly of Vrnjačka Banja:

Šumadija District
Local elections were held in all seven of the Šumadija District's municipalities. The Serbian Renewal Movement won the mayoral contests in four jurisdictions (including Kragujevac), either on its own or in alliance with other parties. The Democratic Party won in Batočina, and a party candidate also won in Knić in alliance with the Serbian Renewal Movement. The Serbian Radical Party won in Aranđelovac, while a Democratic Party of Serbia–New Serbia alliance won in Topola.

Kragujevac

Results of the election for the Municipal Assembly of Kragujevac:

Aranđelovac

Results of the election for the Municipal Assembly of Aranđelovac:

Batočina

Results of the election for the Municipal Assembly of Batočina:

Knić

Results of the election for the Municipal Assembly of Knić:

Lapovo

Results of the election for the Municipal Assembly of Lapovo:

Rača

Results of the election for the Municipal Assembly of Rača:

Topola

Results of the election for the Municipal Assembly of Topola:

References

Elections in Serbia
Local elections in Serbia
Local
September 2004 events in Europe
October 2004 events in Europe